The 1992 NCAA Division I women's volleyball tournament began with 32 teams and ended on December 19, 1992, when Stanford defeated UCLA 3-1 in the NCAA championship match.

Stanford won the program's first NCAA title after three previous runner-up finishes. UCLA was the top ranked team in the country and was undefeated coming into the match. The Bruins were the two time defending national champions, and became the first university to appear in three straight NCAA title matches, equaling its previous AIAW national title match streak from 1974 through 1976. UCLA's 43 match win streak was snapped with the loss.

The 1992 Final Four was held at The Pit in Albuquerque, New Mexico.

Records
{|
| valign=top |

Brackets

West regional

South regional

Northwest regional

Mideast regional

Final Four - The Pit, Albuquerque, New Mexico

See also
NCAA Women's Volleyball Championship

References

NCAA Women's Volleyball Championship
NCAA
Volleyball in New Mexico
NCAA Division I women's volleyball tournament
NCAA Division I women's volleyball tournament
Sports competitions in New Mexico
1992 in women's volleyball